M. R. Santhanalakshmi (1905–1957) was a Tamil film actress who played lead roles in movies of the 1930s and 1940s.

Filmography

References 

 

Tamil actresses
Indian film actresses
People from Thanjavur district
1905 births
1957 deaths
20th-century Indian actresses